Tsendiin Damdinsüren (1908–1986) was a Mongolian writer and linguist. He wrote the text to one version of the national anthem of Mongolia.

Life 
Damdinsüren was born in Mongolia 1908, in what is today the Dornod Aimag (province).

As a young man, he was politically active in the Mongolian Revolutionary Youth League, where he was elected into the Central Committee in 1926, and eventually became an editor of its publications. Later he became the chairman of the Council of Mongolian Trade Unions and was involved in the collectivization and seizures. He joined the MPRP in 1932. In 1933 he continued his education in Leningrad.

After returning to Mongolia in 1938, Damdinsüren became an ally of Yumjaagiin Tsedenbal, the future party secretary, Prime Minister, and President. He promoted the switch from the vertically written classical Mongolian script to an adapted Cyrillic script. He was forced to do it as he was politically repressed and imprisoned and was threatened by capital punishment. Between 1942 and 1946 he was an editor for the party newspaper Ünen (The Truth). In 1959 he became chairman of the Committee of Sciences, and between 1953 and 1955 he was chairman of the Writers Union.

Works 
Damdinsüren wrote poetry that was well received in Mongolia. He also produced prose and literary studies, and a translation of The Secret History of the Mongols into modern Mongolian. The language of his poems and prose were largely based on the oral literary traditions of Mongolia, which he developed into a classical language of the Mongolian literature of the 20th century. His novel Gologdson Khüükhen (The Rejected Girl) became one of the popular films of the 1960s.

He created the first large Russian-Mongolian dictionary and wrote the text to the national anthem that was in use between 1950 and 1962, and in parts after 1991.

See also 
 Culture of Mongolia
 Ryenchinii Choinom

External links 
 BookRags: Damdinsüren, Tsendiin, biography from the Encyclopedia of Modern Asia.

References 

Mongolian writers
1908 births
1986 deaths
People from Dornod Province
National anthem writers
Mongolian orientalists
Tibetologists
Mongolists
Tibetan–Russian translators
20th-century translators